The Trans-Siberian Railway (TSR; ,) connects European Russia to the Russian Far East. It runs from the city of Moscow in the west to the city of Vladivostok in the east.

During the period of the Russian Empire, government ministers—personally appointed by Alexander III and his son Nicholas II—supervised the building of the railway network between 1891 and 1916. Even before its completion, the line attracted travelers who documented their experiences. Since 1916, the Trans-Siberian Railway has directly connected Moscow with Vladivostok. , expansion projects remain underway, with connections being built to Russia's neighbors (namely Mongolia, China, and North Korea). Additionally, there have been proposals and talks to expand the network to Tokyo, Japan, with new bridges that would connect the mainland railway through the Russian island of Sakhalin and the Japanese island of Hokkaido.

Route description

The railway is often associated with the main transcontinental Russian line that connects many large and small cities of the European and Asian parts of Russia. Taking eight days to complete the journey, it is the third-longest single continuous service in the world, after the Moscow–Pyongyang  and the Kyiv (Kiev)–Vladivostok  services, both of which also follow the Trans-Siberian for much of their routes.

The main route of the Trans-Siberian Railway begins in Moscow at Yaroslavsky Vokzal, runs through Yaroslavl or Chelyabinsk, Omsk, Novosibirsk, Krasnoyarsk, Irkutsk, Ulan-Ude, Chita, and Khabarovsk to Vladivostok via southern Siberia. From Tarskaya the Trans-Manchurian heads southeast, via Harbin and Mudanjiang in China's Northeastern Provinces (from where a connection to Beijing is used by one of the Moscow–Beijing trains), joining with the main route in Ussuriysk just north of Vladivostok. This is the shortest and the oldest railway route to Vladivostok. While there are currently no traverse passenger services (enter China from one side and then exit China and return to Russia on the other side) on this branch, it is still used by several international passenger services between Russia and China.

The third primary route is the Trans-Mongolian Railway, which coincides with the Trans-Siberian as far as Ulan-Ude on Lake Baikal's eastern shore. From Ulan-Ude the Trans-Mongolian heads south to Ulaanbaatar before making its way southeast to Beijing. In 1991, a fourth route running further to the north was finally completed, after more than five decades of sporadic work. Known as the Baikal–Amur Mainline (BAM), this recent extension departs from the Trans-Siberian line at Taishet several hundred miles west of Lake Baikal and passes the lake at its northernmost extremity. It crosses the Amur River at Komsomolsk-na-Amure (north of Khabarovsk), and reaches the Tatar Strait at Sovetskaya Gavan.

History

Demand and design
In the late 19th century, the development of Siberia was hampered by poor transport links within the region, as well as with the rest of the country. Aside from the Great Siberian Route, good roads suitable for wheeled transport were rare. For about five months of the year, rivers were the main means of transport. During the cold half of the year, cargo and passengers traveled by horse-drawn sledges over the winter roads, many of which were the same rivers, but ice-covered.

The first steamboat on the River Ob, Nikita Myasnikov's Osnova, was launched in 1844. But early beginnings were difficult, and it was not until 1857 that steamboat shipping started developing on the Ob system in a serious way. Steamboats started operating on the Yenisei in 1863, and on the Lena and Amur in the 1870s. While the comparative flatness of Western Siberia was at least fairly well served by the gigantic Ob–Irtysh–Tobol–Chulym river system, the mighty rivers of Eastern Siberia—the Yenisei, the upper course of the Angara River (the Angara below Bratsk was not easily navigable because of the rapids), and the Lena—were mostly navigable only in the north-south direction. An attempt to partially remedy the situation by building the Ob-Yenisei Canal was not particularly successful. Only a railway could be a real solution to the region's transport problems.

The first railway projects in Siberia emerged after the completion of the Saint Petersburg–Moscow Railway in 1851. One of the first was the Irkutsk–Chita project, proposed by the American entrepreneur Perry Collins and supported by Transport Minister Constantine Possiet with a view toward connecting Moscow to the Amur River, and consequently, to the Pacific Ocean. Siberia's governor, Nikolay Muravyov-Amursky, was anxious to advance Russian colonization of the now Russian Far East, but his plans were unfeasible as long as colonists had to import grain and other food from China and Korea. It was on Muravyov's initiative that surveys for a railway in the Khabarovsk region were conducted.

Before 1880, the central government had virtually ignored these projects, because of the weakness of Siberian enterprises, a clumsy bureaucracy, and fear of financial risk. By 1880, there were a large number of rejected and upcoming applications for permission to construct railways to connect Siberia with the Pacific, but not Eastern Russia. This worried the government and made connecting Siberia with Central Russia a pressing concern. The design process lasted 10 years. Along with the route actually constructed, alternative projects were proposed:
 Southern route: via Kazakhstan, Barnaul, Abakan and Mongolia.
 Northern route: via Tyumen, Tobolsk, Tomsk, Yeniseysk and the modern Baikal Amur Mainline or even through Yakutsk.

The line was divided into seven sections, on all or most of which work was simultaneously conducted by 62,000 workers. With financial support provided by leading European financier, Baron Henri Hottinguer of the Parisian bankers Hottinger & Cie, the total cost estimated at £35 million was raised with the first section (Chelyabinsk to the River Ob) finished at a cost £900,000 less than anticipated . Railwaymen fought against suggestions to save funds, for example, by installing ferryboats instead of bridges over the rivers until traffic increased. The designers insisted and secured the decision to construct an uninterrupted railway.

Unlike the rejected private projects that intended to connect the existing cities demanding transport, the Trans-Siberian did not have such a priority. Thus, to save money and avoid clashes with land owners, it was decided to lay the railway outside the existing cities. Tomsk was the largest city, and the most unfortunate, because the swampy banks of the Ob River near it were considered inappropriate for a bridge. The railway was laid  to the south (instead crossing the Ob at Novonikolaevsk, later renamed Novosibirsk); just a dead-end branch line connected with Tomsk, depriving the city of the prospective transit railway traffic and trade.

Construction

On 9 March 1891, the Russian government issued an imperial rescript in which it announced its intention to construct a railway across Siberia. Tsarevich Nicholas (later Tsar Nicholas II) inaugurated the construction of the railway in Vladivostok on 19 May that year.

Until the Circum-Baikal Railway was built the line ended on either side of the lake. The ice-breaking train ferry  built in 1897 and smaller ferry SS Angara built in about 1900 made the four-hour crossing to link the two railheads.

The Russian admiral and explorer Stepan Makarov (1849–1904) designed Baikal and Angara but they were built in Newcastle upon Tyne, by Armstrong Whitworth. They were "knock down" vessels; that is, each ship was bolted together in the United Kingdom, every part of the ship was marked with a number, the ship was disassembled into many hundreds of parts and transported in kit form to Listvyanka where a shipyard was built especially to reassemble them. Their boilers, engines and some other components were built in Saint Petersburg and transported to Listvyanka to be installed. Angara was smaller, with two funnels.

Completion of the Circum-Baikal Railway in 1904 bypassed the ferries, but from time to time the Circum-Baikal Railway suffered from derailments or rockfalls so both ships were held in reserve until 1916. Baikal was burnt out and destroyed in the Russian Civil War but Angara survives. It has been restored and is permanently moored at Irkutsk where it serves as an office and a museum.

In winter, sleighs were used to move passengers and cargo from one side of the lake to the other until the completion of the Lake Baikal spur along the southern edge of the lake. With the Amur River Line north of the Chinese border being completed in 1916, there was a continuous railway from Petrograd to Vladivostok that, to this day, is the world's second longest railway line. There were expectations upon electrification that it would increase rail traffic on the line by 40 percent.

Effects

Siberian agriculture began to send cheap grain westwards beginning around 1869. Agriculture in Central Russia was still under economic pressure after the end of serfdom, which was formally abolished in 1861. To defend the central territory and prevent possible social destabilization, the Tsarist government introduced the Chelyabinsk tariff-break in 1896, a tariff barrier for grain passing through Chelyabinsk, and a similar barrier in Manchuria. This measure changed the nature of export: mills emerged to produce bread from grain in Altai Krai, Novosibirsk and Tomsk, and many farms switched to corn (maize) production.

The railway immediately filled to capacity with local traffic, mostly wheat. From 1896 until 1913 Siberia exported on average  (30,643,000 pood) of grain and flour annually. During the Russo-Japanese War of 1904–1905, military traffic to the east disrupted the flow of civil freight.

The Trans-Siberian Railway brought with it millions of peasant-migrants from the Western regions of Russia and Ukraine. Between 1906 and 1914, the peak migration years, about 4 million peasants arrived in Siberia. 

Historian Christian Wolmar argues that the railroad was a failure, because it was built for narrow political reasons, with poor supervision and planning. The costs were vastly exaggerated to enrich greedy bureaucrats. The planners hoped it would stimulate settlement, but the Siberian lands were too infertile and cold and distant. There was little settlement beyond 30 miles from the line. The fragile system could not handle the heavy traffic demanded in wartime, so the Japanese in 1904 knew they were safe in their war with Russia. Wolmar concludes:

War and revolution

In the Russo-Japanese War (1904–1905), the strategic importance and limitations of the Trans-Siberian Railway contributed to Russia's defeat in the war. As the line was single track, transit was slower as trains had to wait in crossing sidings for opposing trains to cross. This limited the capacity of the line and increased transit times. A troop train or a train carrying injured personnel traveling from east to west would delay the arrival of troops or supplies and ammunition in a train traveling from west to east. The supply difficulties meant the Russian forces had limited troops and supplies while Japanese forces with shorter lines of communication were able to attack and advance.

After the Russian Revolution of 1917, the railway served as the vital line of communication for the Czechoslovak Legion and the allied armies that landed troops at Vladivostok during the Siberian Intervention of the Russian Civil War. These forces supported the White Russian government of Admiral Alexander Kolchak, based in Omsk, and White Russian soldiers fighting the Bolsheviks on the Ural front. The intervention was weakened, and ultimately defeated, by partisan fighters who blew up bridges and sections of track, particularly in the volatile region between Krasnoyarsk and Chita.

There was traveling the leader of legions professor Thomas Garrigue Masaryk from Moscow to Vladivostok in March and August 1918, on his journey to Japan and United States of America.
The Trans-Siberian Railway also played a very direct role during parts of Russia's history, with the Czechoslovak Legion using heavily armed and armored trains to control large amounts of the railway (and of Russia itself) during the Russian Civil War at the end of World War I. As one of the few fighting forces left in the aftermath of the imperial collapse, and before the Red Army took control, the Czechs and Slovaks were able to use their organization and the resources of the railway to establish a temporary zone of control before eventually continuing onwards towards Vladivostok, from where they emigrated back to Czechoslovakia.

World War II

During World War II, the Trans-Siberian Railway played an important role in the supply of the powers fighting in Europe.  In 1939-1941 it was a source of rubber for Germany thanks to the USSR-Germany pact. While Germany's merchant shipping was shut down, the Trans-Siberian Railway (along with its Trans-Manchurian branch) served as the essential link between Germany and Japan, especially rubber. By March 1941,  of this material would, on average, traverse the Trans-Siberian Railway every day on its way to Germany.

At the same time, a number of Jews and anti-Nazis used the Trans-Siberian Railway to escape Europe, including the mathematician Kurt Gödel and Betty Ehrlich Löwenstein, mother of British actor, director and producer Heinz Bernard. Several thousand Jewish refugees were able to make this trip thanks to the Curaçao visas issued by the Dutch consul Jan Zwartendijk and the Japanese visas issued by the Japanese consul, Chiune Sugihara, in Kaunas, Lithuania. Typically, they took the TSR to Vladivostok, then by ship to US. Until June 1941, pro-Nazi ethnic Germans from the Americas used the TSR to go to Germany.

The situation reversed after 22 June 1941. By invading the Soviet Union, Germany cut off its only reliable trade route to Japan. Instead, it had to use fast merchant ships and later large oceanic submarines to evade the Allied blockade. On the other hand, the USSR received Lend-Lease supplies from the US. Even after Japan went to war with the US, despite German complaints, Japan usually allowed Soviet ships to sail between the US and Vladivostok unmolested. As a result, the Pacific Route – via northern Pacific Ocean and the TSR – became the safest connection between the US and the USSR.

Accordingly, it accounted for as much freight as the North Atlantic–Arctic and Iranian routes combined, though cargoes were limited to raw materials and non-military goods. From 1941–42 the TSR also played an important role in relocating Soviet industries from European Russia to Siberia in the face of the German invasion.

The TSR transported Soviet troops west from the Far East to take part in the Soviet counter-offensive in December 1941, and later east from Germany to the Japanese front in preparation for the Soviet–Japanese War of August 1945. Although the Japanese estimated that an attack was not likely before Spring 1946, Stavka had planned for a mid-August 1945 offensive, and had concealed the buildup of a force of 90 divisions; many had crossed Siberia in their vehicles to avoid straining the rail link.

Today

The Trans-Siberian line remains the most important transport link within Russia; around 30% of Russian exports travel on the line. While it attracts many foreign tourists, it gets most of its use from domestic passengers.

Today the Trans-Siberian Railway carries about 200,000 containers per year to Europe. Russian Railways intends to at least double the volume of container traffic on the Trans-Siberian and is developing a fleet of specialized cars and increasing terminal capacity at the ports by a factor of 3 to 4.

With perfect coordination of the participating countries' railway authorities, a trainload of containers can be taken from Beijing to Hamburg, via the Trans-Mongolian and Trans-Siberian lines in as little as 15 days, but typical cargo transit times are usually significantly longer and typical cargo transit time from Japan to major destinations in European Russia was reported as around 25 days.

In early 2009; however, Russian Railways announced an ambitious "Trans-Siberian in Seven Days" plan. According to this plan, $11 billion will be invested over the next five years to make it possible for goods traffic to cover the same  distance in just seven days.

Developments in shipping

On January 11, 2008, China, Mongolia, Russia, Belarus, Poland, and Germany agreed to collaborate on a cargo train service between Beijing and Hamburg.

With its 2009 rate schedule, the Trans-Siberian Railway will transport a forty-foot container to Poland from Yokohama for $2,820, or from Busan for $2,154.

One of the most complicating factors related to such ventures is the fact that the CIS states' broad railway gauge is incompatible with China and Western and Central Europe's standard gauge. Therefore, a train traveling from China to Western Europe encounters gauge breaks twice: at the Chinese–Mongolian or the Chinese–Russian frontier and at the Ukrainian or the Belorussian border with Central European countries.

Trans-Siberian route in seven days
In 2008, the Russian Railways JSC (state company) launched a program for the accelerated delivery of containers cargo by block trains from the Far-Eastern ports (Vladivostok, Nakhodka and others) to the western borders of Russia, called "Transsib in 7 days". Within the framework of the program it is planned to decrease the cargo delivery time from the Far East from 11 days in 2008 to seven days in 2015. The first accelerated experimental block-train was launched in February 2009 from Vladivostok to Moscow.

Gallery

Routes

Trans-Siberian line
A commonly used main line route is as follows. Distances and travel times are from the schedule of train No. 002M, Moscow–Vladivostok.

There are many alternative routings between Moscow and Siberia. For example:

 One can take a night train from Moscow's Kursky Rail Terminal to Nizhny Novgorod, make a stopover in the Nizhny and then transfer to a Siberia-bound train
 From 1956 to 2001 many trains went between Moscow and Kirov via Yaroslavl instead of Nizhny Novgorod.
 Other trains get from Moscow (Kazansky Terminal) to Yekaterinburg via Kazan.
 Between Yekaterinburg and Omsk it is possible to travel via Kurgan Petropavlovsk (in Kazakhstan) instead of Tyumen.
 One can bypass Yekaterinburg altogether by traveling via Samara, Ufa, Chelyabinsk and Petropavlovsk; this was historically the earliest configuration.

Depending on the route taken, the distances from Moscow to the same station in Siberia may differ by several tens of km (a few dozen miles).

Trans-Manchurian line

The Trans–Manchurian line, as e.g. used by train No.020, Moscow–Beijing follows the same route as the Trans-Siberian between Moscow and Chita and then follows this
route to China:
 Branch off from the Trans-Siberian-line at Tarskaya ( from Moscow)
 Zabaikalsk, Russian border town; there is a break-of-gauge
 Manzhouli ( from Moscow,  from Beijing), Chinese border city
 Harbin (1,388 km) Chinese city
 Changchun ( from Moscow) Chinese city
 Beijing ( from Moscow) the Chinese capital

The express train (No. 020) travel time from Moscow to Beijing is just over six days. There is no direct passenger service along the entire original Trans-Manchurian route (i.e., from Moscow or anywhere in Russia, west of Manchuria, to Vladivostok via Harbin), due to the obvious administrative and technical (gauge break) inconveniences of crossing the border twice. Assuming sufficient patience and possession of appropriate visas, however, it is still possible to travel all the way along the original route, with a few stopovers (e.g. in Harbin, Grodekovo and Ussuriysk).

Such an itinerary would pass through the following points from Harbin east:
 Harbin ( from Moscow)
 Mudanjiang 
 Suifenhe, the Chinese border station 
 Grodekovo, Russia 
 Ussuriysk 
 Vladivostok

Trans-Mongolian line

The Trans–Mongolian line follows the same route as the Trans-Siberian between Moscow and Ulan Ude, and then follows this route to Mongolia and China:
 Branch off from the Trans-Siberian line ( from Moscow)
 Naushki (MT+5), Russian border town
 Russian–Mongolian border (MT+5)
 Sükhbaatar (MT+5), Mongolian border town
 Ulaanbaatar (MT+5), the Mongolian capital
 Zamyn-Üüd (MT+5), Mongolian border city
 Erenhot ( from Beijing, MT+5), Chinese border city
 Datong (MT+5) Chinese city
 Beijing (MT+5) the Chinese capital

Highest point

The highest point of Trans–Siberian Railroad is at Yablonovy pass at an altitude of 1070m situated in the Yablonoi Mountains, in Transbaikal (mainly in Zabaykalsky Krai), Siberia, Russia. The Trans–Siberian Railroad passes the mountains at Chita and runs parallel to the range before going through a tunnel to bypass the heights.

See also

 Baikal–Amur Mainline
 Famous trains
 History of Siberia
 Russian gauge
 Broad gauge
 Russian Railways
 Sibirjak
 Starlight Express, a train musical in which a character is modeled on the Trans-Siberian Express.
 Trans-Siberian Railway Panorama

References

Further reading
 
 Banerjee, Anindita. "The Trans-Siberian Railroad and Russia's Asia: Literature, Geopolitics, Philosophy of History" Clio. Fall2004/Winter2005, Vol. 34 Issue 1/2, pp 19-40.
 Cherkashin, A. "Trans-Siberian railway and interrelation of economic development of regions." IOP Conference Series: Earth and Environmental Science Vol. 190. No. 1. 2018 online.
 
 Dmitriev-Mamanov, A.I. and A. F. Zdziarski, eds. Guide to the Great Siberian Railway 1900 (reprinted by David & Charles, 1971), the official guide.
 
 Garbutt, P. E. "The Trans-Siberian Railway." Journal of Transport History 4 (1954): 238-249. 
 Grams, Grant W. (2021). Return Migration of German Nationals from the United States and Canada, 1933–1941 (Jefferson, North Carolina, McFarland Publications_
 Hookham, Hilda. "Builders of the Trans-Siberian Railway" History Today (Aug 1966), Vol. 16 Issue 8, pp. 528–37
 Jefferson, Robert L. Roughing it in Siberia ((Sampson Low, Marston, 1987)
 
 Meakin, Annette M. B. A Ribbon of  Iron (BiblioLife, 2009).
 
 
 Mironova, Marina Nikolaevna, Natalia Gennadievna Kuznetsova, and Aleksandr Nikolaevich Sholudko. "Types of cities of the Trans-Siberian railway: Dynamics of population and industrial functions." RUDN Journal of Economics 25.4 (2017): 553-565.
 
 Pepe, Jacopo Maria. "The “Eastern Polygon” of the Trans-Siberian rail line: a critical factor for assessing Russia’s strategy toward Eurasia and the Asia-Pacific." Asia Europe Journal 18.3 (2020): 305-324.
 Read, Arnot. From Peking to Petersburg (BiblioLife, 2009
 
  Guide book for travelers
 Sahi, Juha. "The Trans-Siberian railway as a corridor of trade between Finland and Japan in the midst of world crises." Journal of Transport History 36.1 (2015): 58-76.
  Guide book for travelers
 , wide-ranging popular history.

External links

 Trans-Siberian Railway, National Geographic Expeditions website
 Trans-Siberian Railway: a view from Moscow to Vladivostok – a photo essay (27 December 2016), The Guardian.  Photographs of "life on board the Trans-Siberian Railway, and beyond the carriage window". 
 Russian Railways official  website
 Overview of passenger travel today
 
 Guide to the Great Siberian Railway (1900)
 
 
  illustrated description of the route and the train
 

 
1916 in rail transport
Named passenger trains of Russia
Night trains of Russia
Rail transport in Siberia
Rail transport in the Russian Far East
Railway lines in Russia
Train-related introductions in 1916